is a common primarily feminine Japanese given name.

Possible writings
Manami can be written using different kanji characters and can mean:
愛美, "love, beauty"
愛海, "love, sea"
愛未, "love, sheep"
愛実, "love, fruit"
真名美, "truth, name, beauty"
真奈美, "truth, Nara, beauty"
麻奈美, "hemp, Nara, beauty"
真奈海, "truth, Nara, sea"

The name can also be written in hiragana or katakana.

People
, Japanese women's basketball player
Manami Higa (愛未, born 1986), Japanese actress
Manami Hino (真奈美, born 1980), Japanese bobsledder
Manami Honjo (本上まなみ), a Japanese actress
Manami Katsu (愛実, born 1994), Japanese professional wrestler
, Japanese model
Manami Komori (まなみ), a Japanese radio personality, singer, voice actress, and essayist
Manami Konishi (真奈美, born 1978), Japanese actress
Manami Kurose (真奈美, born 1991), Japanese actress and singer
Manami Matsumae (真奈美), Japanese game music composer
Manami Numakura (愛美), Japanese voice actress
Manami Oku (真奈美, born 1995), Japanese idol singer
Manami Toyota (真奈美, born 1971), Japanese professional wrestler
Manami Wakayama (愛美, born 1986), Japanese idol
Manami Watanabe (愛未, born 1986), female lead singer of Jyukai, a Japanese pop/soft rock group

Characters
Manami Amamiya (学美), the main character in the manga and anime series Gakuen Utopia Manabi Straight!
Manami Aoki (真奈美), the character in the manga series Haikyū!!, the position is Setter and the number is 3
Manami Hyuga (真奈美), a character in the 1998 Japanese film Bayside Shakedown: The Movie
Manami Kasuga (まなみ), a character in the manga and anime series Kimagure Orange Road
Manami Kusunoki (真奈美), a character from the 2D fighting game Variable Geo series
Manami Tamura (麻奈実), a character in the manga and anime series Ore no Imōto ga Konna ni Kawaii Wake ga Nai
Manami Okuda (愛美), a character in the manga and anime series Assassination Classroom

Japanese feminine given names
Japanese unisex given names